Chalautriers may refer to:
Chalautre-la-Petite commune inhabitants
Chalautre-la-Grande inhabitants